Auflance is a commune in the Ardennes department and Grand Est region of north-eastern France.

Geography
Auflance is located on the frontier of Belgium along its eastern border some 38 km east by south-east of Sedan and 17 km north-west of Montmédy. Access to the commune is by the D17 road from Puilly-et-Charbeaux in the north-west which passes through the centre of the commune and the village and continues to Sapogne-sur-Marche in the south-east. A small country road crosses the Belgian border and goes to Villers-Devant-Orval. The commune is mixed forest and farmland.

The Marche river forms the south-eastern border of the commune as it flows south-west to join the Chiers near Margut. The Paquis river passes through the centre of the commune from north-west to south-east where it joins the Marche on the border of the commune. The Coquerte flows from the north in the west to the commune to join the Paquis.

Neighbouring communes and villages

Heraldry

Administration

List of Successive Mayors

Demography
In 2017 the commune had 86 inhabitants.

Sites and monuments

The Chateau of Auflance (17th century) is registered as a historical monument. In the 17th century the Custine family came to settle in this border commune. They built a castle of which only a few vestiges remain: a round tower, tunnels, and a remarkable Renaissance door decorated with coats of arms and surmounted by a Pietà.
In the Church the Funeral Chapel of the Custines has a hallway decorated with coats of arms which were made during the French Revolution
The Saints of Auflance Chapel from the 13th century has 13 statues which have been stored out of fear of theft. These statues of the Saints of Auflance are registered as historical objects.

See also
Communes of the Ardennes department

References

External links

Auflance on the old IGN website 
Auflance on Géoportail, National Geographic Institute (IGN) website 
Aufflance on the 1750 Cassini Map

Communes of Ardennes (department)